Sphenomorphus latifasciatus is a species of skink. It is found in Indonesia.

References

latifasciatus
Reptiles of Indonesia
Reptiles described in 1874
Taxa named by Adolf Bernhard Meyer
Skinks of New Guinea